Tadjena (formerly Fromentin) is a town in the Dahra mountains in Chlef Province in central Algeria, with a population of about 23,000; its altitude is 438 m.

History
The settlement of Tadjena was originally named after Eugene Fromentin, a French painter and poet who spent a lot of time in Algeria. The Tadjena massacre in 1997 occurred in two villages nearby.

Further reading

 Chlef.net

Communes of Chlef Province
Cities in Algeria
Algeria